Jeff F. King is a Canadian screenwriter, comics writer, television producer and film director. King served as co-executive (1994–95) and then executive producer (1995–96) for the Canadian television series Due South and was the co-recipient of three Gemini Awards. He then worked as the producer of the CBS show EZ Streets and as co-executive producer for Stargate SG-1. His other television credits include Relic Hunter, Strange Days at Blake Holsey High, Mutant X, Dinosapien, White Collar, The Umbrella Academy, and The Acolyte.

As a comics writer, he wrote the 2015 DC Comics series "Convergence", for which he created the character Telos, the decoy central antagonist-turned anti-hero of the story.

References

External links

Canadian film directors
Canadian television directors
Canadian television producers
Canadian television writers
Living people
Place of birth missing (living people)
Year of birth missing (living people)